Pseudo-City (2005) is the third book by American author D. Harlan Wilson.  Referred to as a novel as often as a collection of stories—Wilson himself has called it a "story-cycle"—it contains twenty-nine irreal short stories and flash fiction that overlap and feature recurrent characters.  Pieces in this collection originally appeared in magazines and journals such as Albedo one, The Dream People, Red Cedar Review, Nemonymous, Milk Magazine and Bust Down the Door and Eat All the Chickens.

External links 
 Review by Mary Pat Mann at Mytholog

2001 short story collections
Novels by D. Harlan Wilson
Short story collections by D. Harlan Wilson